Vinod Kumar Duggal (born 26 November 1944) is a retired Indian civil servant. Duggal served as Home Secretary in the Government of India from 2005 to 2007 in the government of Manmohan Singh. He belongs to the 1968 batch of IAS. On 23 December 2013 he was appointed governor of Manipur by President Pranab Mukherjee. He was also given the additional responsibility as Governor of Mizoram as the governor Kamla Beniwal was sacked on 8 August 2014.

Early life
Vinod Duggal went to National Defence Academy and later appeared for civil services. He served as a short service commission officer in the Indian Army.

Career
Vinod Duggal also worked as a Secretary, Water Resources, in 2005.
In 2009, he was appointed a member-secretary of the Srikrishna committee on Telangana. He served in the Municipal Corporation of Delhi as commissioner between 1996–2000. He served as the Sri Krishna Committee member to look into the demand of Telangana state.

He is also a member of the Justice Punchhi Commission on Centre-State relations.

References

External links
  High Court Judgement on 'undemocratic secrete 8th chapter of Srikrishna committee'
 Full Text of Secret Note of Chapter 8 of Srikrishna committee

Indian Administrative Service officers
Indian Home Secretaries
Living people
1944 births
People from Sialkot
Governors of Mizoram